The 2017 season marks Bangkok United's 11th appearance in the Thai League T1 and 5th-consecutive season in the top flight of Thai football. Brazilian Alexandré Pölking was manager for the side in his 4th season in charge.

Game log

Thai FA Cup

Thai League Cup

AFC Champions League

Qualifying rounds

Reserve team in Thai League 4

Bangkok United sent its reserve team to compete in T4 Bangkok Metropolitan Region as Bangkok United B.

Goals

Transfers
The first Thai footballer's market was open between December 14, 2016, and January 28, 2017. The second Thai footballer's market was open between June 3, 2017, and June 30, 2017.

In

Out

Loan out

References

External links
 Bangkok United F.C. official website
 Thai League official website

BU
2017